Cinnamedrine (INN, USAN), also known as N-cinnamylephedrine, is a sympathomimetic drug with similar effects relative to those of ephedrine. It also has some local anesthetic activity. Cinnamedrine was previously used, in combination with analgesics, as an antispasmodic to treat dysmenorrhea in the over-the-counter drug Midol in the 1980s. There is a case report of the drug being abused as a psychostimulant.

References

Antispasmodics
Local anesthetics
Norepinephrine releasing agents
Phenylethanolamines
Substituted amphetamines
Sympathomimetics